Robert Ring (October 6, 1946 – June 22, 2017) was an American professional ice hockey goaltender who played in one National Hockey League game for the Boston Bruins during the 1965–66 NHL season. On October 30, 1965 he was replaced the injured Ed Johnston during an 8-2 loss to the New York Rangers. He graduated from Wakefield High School (Massachusetts), Acadia University, and received his Master's degree from Boston University. He worked for The Phone Company as Director of Human Resources in Boston after his playing career ended.

Career statistics

Regular season and playoffs

See also
List of players who played only one game in the NHL

References

External links

1946 births
2017 deaths
Acadia University alumni
American men's ice hockey goaltenders
Boston Bruins players
Ice hockey players from Massachusetts
Niagara Falls Flyers players
People from Winchester, Massachusetts
Springfield Indians players
Sportspeople from Middlesex County, Massachusetts